Abdur Rashid is a politician and the former Member of Parliament of Comilla-2. He started his political career under the leadership of Bangabondhu Sheikh Mujibur Rahman. He became the Member of Provincial Assembly in 1970 in Awami League Ticket.

Career
Rashid was elected to parliament from Comilla-8 as a Jatiya Samajtantrik Dal candidate in 1979. He was elected to parliament from Comilla-2 as a Jatiya Party candidate in 1986 and 1988.

References

Jatiya Party politicians
Living people
3rd Jatiya Sangsad members
4th Jatiya Sangsad members
Year of birth missing (living people)